Crew resource management or cockpit resource management (CRM) is a set of training procedures for use in environments where human error can have devastating effects. CRM is primarily used for improving aviation safety and focuses on interpersonal communication, leadership, and decision making in aircraft  cockpits. Its founder is David Beaty, a former Royal Air Force and a BOAC pilot who wrote "The Human Factor in Aircraft Accidents" (1969). Despite the considerable development of electronic aids since then, many principles he developed continue to prove effective.

CRM in the US formally began with a National Transportation Safety Board (NTSB) recommendation written by NTSB Air Safety Investigator and aviation psychologist Alan Diehl during his investigation of the 1978 United Airlines Flight 173 crash. The issues surrounding that crash included a DC-8 crew running out of fuel over Portland, Oregon, while troubleshooting a landing gear problem.

The term "cockpit resource management"—which was later generalized to "crew resource management"—was coined in 1979 by NASA psychologist John Lauber, who for several years had studied communication processes in cockpits. While retaining a command hierarchy, the concept was intended to foster a less-authoritarian cockpit culture in which co-pilots are encouraged to question captains if they observed them making mistakes.

CRM grew out of the 1977 Tenerife airport disaster, in which two Boeing 747 aircraft collided on the runway, killing 583 people. A few weeks later, NASA held a workshop on the topic, endorsing this training. In the US, United Airlines was the first airline to launch a comprehensive CRM program, starting in 1981. By the 1990s, CRM had become a global standard.

United Airlines trained their flight attendants to use CRM in conjunction with the pilots to provide another layer of enhanced communication and teamwork. Studies have shown the use of CRM by both work groups reduces communication barriers and problems can be solved more efficiently, leading to increased safety. CRM training concepts have been modified for use in a wide range of activities including air traffic control, ship handling, firefighting, and surgery, in which people must make dangerous, time-critical decisions.

Overview

The current generic term "crew resource management" (CRM) has been widely adopted but is also known as cockpit resource management; flightdeck resource management; and command, leadership and resource management. When CRM techniques are applied to other arenas, they are sometimes given unique labels, such as maintenance resource management, bridge resource management, or maritime resource management.

CRM training encompasses a wide range of knowledge, skills, and attitudes including communications, situational awareness, problem solving, decision making, and teamwork; together with all the attendant sub-disciplines which each of these areas entails. CRM can be defined as a system that uses resources to promote safety within the workplace.

CRM is concerned with the cognitive and interpersonal skills needed to manage resources within an organized system rather than with the technical knowledge and skills required to operate equipment. In this context, cognitive skills are defined as the mental processes used for gaining and maintaining situational awareness, for solving problems and for making decisions. Interpersonal skills are regarded as communications and a range of behavioral activities associated with teamwork. In many operational systems, skill areas often overlap, and are not confined to multi-crew craft or equipment, and relate to single operator equipment or craft.

Aviation organizations including major airlines and military aviation have introduced CRM training for crews. CRM training is now a mandated requirement for commercial pilots working under most regulatory bodies, including the FAA (US) and EASA (Europe). The NOTECHS system is used to evaluate non-technical skills. Following the lead of the commercial airline industry, the US Department of Defense began training its air crews in CRM in the mid 1980s. The U.S. Air Force and U.S. Navy require all air crew members to receive annual CRM training to reduce human-error-caused mishaps. The U.S. Army has its own version of CRM called Aircrew Coordination Training Enhanced (ACT-E).

Case studies

United Airlines Flight 173

When the crew of United Airlines Flight 173 was making an approach to Portland International Airport on the evening of Dec 28, 1978, they experienced a landing gear abnormality. The captain decided to enter a holding pattern so they could troubleshoot the problem. The captain focused on the landing gear problem for an hour, ignoring repeated hints from the first officer and the flight engineer about their dwindling fuel supply, and only realized the situation when the engines began flaming out. The aircraft crash-landed in a suburb of Portland, Oregon, over  short of the runway. Of the 189 people aboard, two crew members and eight passengers died. The NTSB Air Safety Investigator Alan Diehl wrote in his report:

Diehl was assigned to investigate this accident and realized it was similar to several other major airline accidents including the crash of Eastern Air Lines Flight 401 and the runway collision between Pan Am and KLM Boeing-747s at Tenerife.

United Airlines Flight 232 

Captain Al Haynes, pilot of United Airlines Flight 232, credits CRM as being one of the factors that saved his own life, and many others, in the Sioux City, Iowa, crash of July 1989:

Air France 447 

One analysis blames failure to follow proper CRM procedures as being a contributing factor that led to the 2009 fatal crash into the Atlantic Ocean of Air France Flight 447 from Rio de Janeiro to Paris. The final report concluded the aircraft crashed after temporary inconsistencies between the airspeed measurements—likely due to the aircraft's pitot tubes being obstructed by ice crystals—caused the autopilot to disconnect, after which the crew reacted incorrectly, causing the aircraft to enter an aerodynamic stall from which it did not recover.

Following recovery of the black box two years later, independent analyses were published before and after the official report was issued by the BEA, France's air safety board. One was a French report in the book "Erreurs de Pilotage" written by Jean-Pierre Otelli, which leaked the final minutes of recorded cockpit conversation. According to Popular Mechanics, which examined the cockpit conversation just before the crash:
 
The men are utterly failing to engage in an important process known as crew resource management, or CRM. They are failing, essentially, to cooperate. It is not clear to either one of them who is responsible for what, and who is doing what.

First Air Flight 6560 

The Canadian Transportation Safety Board (CTSB) determined a failure of Crew Resource Management was largely responsible for the crash of First Air Flight 6560, a Boeing 737-200, in Resolute, Nunavut, on August 20, 2011. A malfunctioning compass gave the crew an incorrect heading, although the instrument landing system and Global Positioning System indicated they were off course. The first officer made several attempts to indicate the problem to the captain but a failure to follow airline procedures and a lack of a standardized communication protocol to indicate a problem led to the captain dismissing the first officer's warnings. Both pilots were also overburdened with making preparations to land, resulting in neither being able to pay full attention to what was happening.

First Air increased the time dedicated to CRM in their training as a result of the accident, and the CTSB recommended regulatory bodies and airlines to standardize CRM procedures and training in Canada.

Qantas Flight 32 

The success of the Qantas Flight 32 flight has been attributed to teamwork and CRM skills. Susan Parson, the editor of the Federal Aviation Administration (FAA) Safety Briefing wrote; "Clearly, the QF32 crew's performance was a bravura example of the professionalism and airmanship every aviation citizen should aspire to emulate".

Carey Edwards, author of Airmanship wrote:

Their crew performance, communications, leadership, teamwork, workload management, situation awareness, problem solving and decision making resulted in no injuries to the 450 passengers and crew. QF32 will remain as one of the finest examples of airmanship in the history of aviation.

Adoption in other fields

Transportation
The basic concepts and ideology of CRM have proven successful in other related fields. In the 1990s, several commercial aviation firms and international aviation safety agencies began expanding CRM into air traffic control, aircraft design, and aircraft maintenance. The aircraft maintenance section of this training expansion gained traction as Maintenance Resource Management (MRM). To attempt to standardize the industry-wide CRM training, the FAA issued Advisory Circular 120–72, Maintenance Resource Management Training in September 2000.

Following a study of aviation mishaps between 1992 and 2002, the United States Air Force determined close to 18% of its aircraft mishaps were directly attributable to human error in maintenance, which often occurred long before the flight in which the problems were discovered. These "latent errors" include failures to follow published aircraft manuals, lack of assertive communication among maintenance technicians, poor supervision, and improper assembly practices. In 2005, to address these human-error-induced aircraft mishaps, Lt Col Doug Slocum, Chief of Safety at the Air National Guard's (ANG) 162nd Fighter Wing, Tucson, directed the modification of the base's CRM program into a military version called Maintenance resource management (MRM).

In mid-2005, the Air National Guard's Aviation Safety Division converted Slocum's MRM program into a national program available to the Air National Guard's flying wings in 54 U.S. states and territories. In 2006, the Defense Safety Oversight Council (DSOC) of the U.S. Department of Defense (DoD) recognized the mishap-prevention value of this maintenance safety program by partially funding a variant of ANG MRM for training throughout the U.S. Air Force. This ANG initiated, DoD-funded version of MRM became known as Air Force Maintenance Resource Management (AF-MRM) and is now widely used in the U.S. Air Force.

The Rail Safety Regulators Panel of Australia has adapted CRM to rail as Rail Resource Management and developed a free kit of resources. Operating train crews at the National Railroad Passenger Corporation (Amtrak) in the United States are instructed on CRM principles during yearly training courses.

CRM has been adopted by merchant shipping worldwide. The STCW Convention and STCW Code, 2017 edition, published by the I.M.O. states the requirements for Bridge Resource Management and Engine Room Resource Management training. These are approved shore-based training, simulator training, or approved in-service experience. Most maritime colleges hold courses for deck and engine room officers. Refresher courses are held every five years. These are referred to as Maritime resource management.

Firefighting
Following its successful use in aviation training, CRM was identified as a potential safety improvement program for the fire services. Ted Putnam wrote a paper that applied CRM concepts to the violent deaths of 14 Wildland firefighters on the South Canyon Fire in Colorado.

From this paper, a movement was initiated in the Wildland and Structural Fire Services to apply CRM concepts to emergency response situations. Various programs have since been developed to train emergency responders in these concepts and to help track breakdowns in these stressful environments.

The International Association of Fire Chiefs published its first CRM manual for the fire service in 2001. It is currently in its third edition. Several industry-specific textbooks have also been published.

Healthcare
Elements of CRM have been applied in US healthcare since the late 1990s, specifically in infection prevention.
For example, the "central line bundle" of best practices recommends using a checklist when inserting a central venous catheter. The observer checking off the checklist is usually lower-ranking than the person inserting the catheter. The observer is encouraged to communicate when elements of the bundle are not executed; for example if a breach in sterility has occurred.

TeamSTEPPS
The Agency for Healthcare Research and Quality (AHRQ), a division of the United States Department of Health and Human Services, also provides training based on CRM principles to healthcare teams. This training, called Team Strategies and Tools to Enhance Performance and Patient Safety (TeamSTEPPS), and the program is currently being implemented in hospitals, long-term care facilities, and primary care clinics around the world. TeamSTEPPs was designed to improve patient safety by teaching healthcare providers how to better collaborate with each other by using tools such as huddles, debriefs, handoffs, and check-backs. Implementing TeamSTEPPS has been shown to improve patient safety. There is evidence TeamSTEPPS interventions are difficult to implement and are not universally effective. There are strategies healthcare leaders can use to improve their chance of implementation success, such as using coaching, supporting, empowering, and supporting behaviors.

See also
 British European Airways Flight 548
 Stress in the aviation industry
 Impact of culture on aviation safety
 Line-oriented flight training
 Saudia Flight 163
 Single pilot resource management
 Sterile Cockpit Rule
 The Checklist Manifesto – primarily a justification of the application of these ideas to safety in medical operating rooms.
 Maritime resource management
 Threat and error management

References

External links 
Military Human Factors 
Crew Resource Management Current Regulatory Paper
Crew Resource Management for the Fire Service 
TeamSTEPPS Program from the U.S. Dept. of Health and Human Services
Flight-crew human factors handbook (CAP 737) 

Aviation safety
Error detection and correction